Ancylosis roscidella is a species of snout moth in the genus Ancylosis. It was described by Eduard Friedrich Eversmann in 1874 and is known from Russia, Azerbaijan, Kazakhstan, Iran, Morocco, Algeria, Libya, Spain, France, most of the Balkan Peninsula and Kazakhstan.

References

External links
lepiforum.de

Moths described in 1874
roscidella
Moths of Europe
Moths of Africa
Moths of Asia